Hasanabad-e Dabirnezam (also Romanized as Ḩasanābād-e Dabīrneẓām) is a village in Posht Rud Rural District, in the Central District of Narmashir County, Kerman Province, Iran. At the 2006 census, its population was 150, in 32 families.

References 

Populated places in Narmashir County